Das (translation: "devotee of God") is a common last name in South Asia, among adherents of Hinduism and Sikhism, as well as those who converted to Islam or Christianity. It is a derived from the Sanskrit word Dasa (Sanskrit: दास) meaning servant, devotee, or votary. "Das" may be inferred to be one who has surrendered to God. The surname is often used by those in the Vaishnav community.

Das is a common surname among Bengali Kayastha apart from other Bengali communities.

More broadly, in Bengal, Bihar, and Jharkhand, the surname "Das" is also used by the Mahishya, Dhobi and Patni communities.

In Assam, the Kaibarta, the Patni, the Koch-Rajbanshi, and other scheduled caste communities also use Das as their surname.

In Odisha, the Das surname is used by the Gopal and Karan castes, while 'Dash' is used by the Brahmins. 

In the Punjab, they generally belong to the Brahmin caste.

Notable people
 Abhishek Das, Indian football player
 Ajit Das, Indian actor
 Amil Kumar Das, Indian astronomer
 Arjun Das, Indian actor
 Atulananda Das, Indian botanist
 Bhagavan Das, Indian Theosophist
 Bhagavan Das, an American yogi
 Bhai Dyal Das, Sikh martyr
 Bhai Mati Das, Sikh martyr
 Bhai Sati Das, Sikh martyr
 Bibhusita Das, Indian marine engineer
 Bina Das, Indian revolutionary and nationalist
 Bishnu Charan Das, Indian politician
 Brojen Das, Bangladeshi swimmer
 Chittaranjan Das, a Bengali lawyer and a major figure in the Indian independence movement
 Dinesh Das, a Bengali poet
 Durga Mohan Das, religious leader and social reformer
 Gardhab Das, fictional character
 Gobindachandra Das, a Bengali poet and writer
 Gopabandhu Das, Indian Freedom Fighter, Reformer, Journalist and educationist from Odisha
 Gurcharan Das, Punjabi Hindu columnist for The Times of India
 Guru Amar Das, the third of the Ten Gurus of Sikhism
 Guru Ram Das, the fourth of the Sikh gurus
 Hima Das, Assamese sprinter
 Jagannath Prasad Das, researcher in psychometrics and author of the (PASS theory of intelligence)
 Jatin Das, Indian painter from Odisha
 Jatindra Nath Das, Freedom fighter
 Jibanananda Das, a Bengali poet
 K. S. R. Das, Indian film director
 Kamala Das, Indian poet and author 
 Khagen Das, Indian politician
 Liton Das, Bangladeshi Cricketer 
 Madhusudan Das, Odia Lawyer and Indian nationalist of the 19th century.
 Maharaja Bhagwant Das, King of Jaipur (1527-1589)
 Manoj Das, English and Odia writer
 Mohini Mohan Das, Indian politician, writer and activist from West Bengal. 
 Monica Das, Indian feminist economist
 Naba Das, Indian politician
 Namit Das is an Indian film and theatre actor.
 Nandita Das, Indian film actress/director from Odisha
 Nobin Chandra Das, Entrepreneur and Inventor of Bengali Rosogolla
 Parichay Das, path-breaker Bhojpuri- Hindi poet, essayist, critic
 Prosenjit Das, Indian cricketer
 Radha Charan Das, Former Vice-Chancellor of Berhampur University
 Raja Bhagwant Das, Rajasthani ruler of Amber
 Ram Dass, American spiritual teacher, yoga guru, and author
 Ranjan Das, Bangladeshi cricketer
 Rima Das, Assamese Indian filmmaker
 Sarala Dasa, 14th-century poet of Odisha
 Sarat Chandra Das, Indian scholar of Tibetan language
 Satish Ranjan Das, legal representative for the Indian government
 Seth Govind Das, a member of Indian Parliament
 Shaktikanta Das, Governor of R.B.I.
 Shiv Sunder Das, Indian Cricketer from Odisha
 Shomie Das, schoolmaster
 Shraddha Das, Indian film actress
 Sudhi Ranjan Das, 5th Chief Justice of India
 Suhasini Das, politician from Bangladesh
 Surya Das, American religious educator
 Tapan Das, Indian actor
 Vasundhara Das, Indian actress and singer
 Veena Das, a professor of anthropology
 Vir Das, comedian and actor

See also
 Dasa
 Dass (disambiguation)
 Gopal Das (disambiguation)

References

Indian surnames
Assamese-language surnames
Bengali Hindu surnames
Punjabi tribes